The 2015 Magyar Kupa, known as  for sponsorship reasons, is the 89th edition of the tournament.

Schedule
The rounds of the 2015–16 competition are scheduled as follows:

Matches 
A total of 63 matches will take place, starting with Preliminary round on 31 October 2015 and culminating with the final on 13 December 2015 at the Bitskey Aladár Uszoda in Eger.

Preliminary round
The first round ties are scheduled for 31 October – 1 November 2015.

Group A
Tournament will be played in Nagykanizsa.

Group B
Tournament will be played in Pécs.

Group C
Tournament will be played in Miskolc.

Group D
Tournament will be played in Szentes.

Quarter-finals
Quarter-final matches were played on 21 and 22 November 2015.

|}

Final four
The final four will be held on 12 and 13 December 2015 at the Bitskey Aladár Uszoda in Eger.

Semi-finals

Final

Final standings

See also
 2015–16 Országos Bajnokság I

References

External links
 Hungarian Water Polo Federaration 

Seasons in Hungarian water polo competitions
Hungary
Magyar Kupa